Saint-Irénée may refer to:
Saint Irénée and Alderwood, a former local service district in New Brunswick
Saint-Irénée, Quebec, a municipality in Capitale-Nationale, Quebec